A cholecystostomy or cholecystotomy is a procedure where a stoma is created in the gallbladder, which can facilitate placement of a tube for drainage, first performed by American surgeon, Dr. John Stough Bobbs, in 1867. It is sometimes used in cases of cholecystitis where the person is ill, and there is a need to delay or defer cholecystectomy. The first endoscopic cholecystostomy was performed by Drs. Todd Baron and Mark Topazian in 2007 using ultrasound guidance to puncture the stomach wall and place a plastic biliary catheter for gallbladder drainage.

See also 
 Interventional Radiology
 List of surgeries by type

References

Accessory digestive gland surgery
Interventional radiology